Legislative Assembly elections were held in Himachal Pradesh on 12 November 2022 to elect 68 members of the Himachal Pradesh Legislative Assembly.

The result was a victory for the Indian National Congress, which returned to power after losing their majority in 2017, continuing a pattern of the incumbent party losing reelection in Himachal Pradesh since 1985.

Sukhvinder Singh Sukhu became the Chief Minister of Himachal Pradesh whereas Mukesh Agnihotri became Deputy Chief Minister of Himachal Pradesh.

Background 

The tenure of Himachal Pradesh Legislative Assembly is scheduled to end on 8 January 2023. The previous assembly elections were held in November 2017. After the election, Bharatiya Janata Party formed the state government, with Jai Ram Thakur becoming chief minister. The Indian National Congress became the opposition with Mukesh Agnihotri becoming Leader of Opposition in the Himachal Pradesh Legislative Assembly.

Bypolls and defections 
Since the last assembly elections, several bypolls were held, the most recent of which were won by the Indian National Congress, with it wresting control of the Mandi Lok Sabha constituency and 3 other assembly constituencies.

Congress MLAs Pawan Kumar Kajal and Lakhvinder Singh Rana joined BJP in August 2022. Kajal was the head of Congress Working committee. The defection of the two senior Congress officials was deemed to be a major blow to the party just a few months prior to the Assembly election. On 28 September 2022, Himachal Pradesh state Congress working president and former cabinet minister Harsh Mahajan joined BJP. The defection was another shock to Congress.

Schedule
The election schedule was announced by the Election Commission of India on 14 October 2022.

Election statistics 
Source:

Parties and alliances





CPI(M) contested the assembly election in alliance with the CPI.



Others

Candidates 
AAP released the first list of 4 candidates on 20 September 2022. Second list of 54 candidates was released on 20 October 2022. Third list of 10 candidates was released on 20 October 2022. AAP's nomination from Darang was withdrawn on 29 October 2022.

CPI(M) released the first list of 11 candidates on 22 September 2022. and second list of 2 candidates on 24 September. However, the earlier lists were withdrawn and a final list of 11 candidates was released on 18 October 2022. It was reported that CPI would contest on 3 seats, but decided to contest on 1 seat only.

Congress released the first list of 46 candidates on 18 October 2022. Second list of 17 candidates was released on 20 October 2022. Congress released third list of 4 candidates on 22 October 2022. Candidate for the remaining 1 seat was named on 25 October 2022.

BJP released the first list of 62 candidates on 19 October 2022. Second list of remaining 6 candidates was released on 20 October 2022. BJP replaced its candidates from Chamba on 20 October 2022 and Kullu on 25 October 2022.

Campaigns

Aam Aadmi Party 
On 6 April 2022, AAP held a roadshow in Mandi with Delhi CM Kejriwal and Punjab Chief Minister Bhagwant Mann. Surjeet Thakur was appointed as President of the state unit in June 2022.

Manifesto 
  
AAP promised 300 units of free electricity to every household, if AAP comes to power.

Aam Aadmi Party published its 10 promises as guarantees of jobs for all youth, unemployment allowance, an advisory board for traders, end of "inspector rule", and corruption-free administration.
Employment: jobs for all youth. AAP promised six lakh government jobs for the youth. AAP will bring laws against exam paper leak, conducting all recruitment exams on time, and jobs will be given on merit, not recommendations.  
Unemployment allowance of ₹3000.
 Implementation of the Old Pension Scheme.
 Agriculture: Minimum Support price (MSP) for agricultural products. controlled atmosphere stores, markets, and food processing units; pesticides and fertilizers at cheap rates; Establish apple packaging manufacturing unit.
 Traders: an advisory board for traders, end of raid raj and "inspector rule", An amnesty scheme for VAT refund. Single window clearance system for tourism projects
 Corruption-free administration, door step delivery of public services.
 Free Healthcare: Mohalla clinics similar to Delhi and free healthcare.
 Free Education: Free education for all till tenth standard. Making temporary teacher posts permanent. Building more schools with quality education. Prevent private schools from exorbitantly raising fees.
 Women: A monthly allowance of ₹1000 to all women in Himachal Pradesh and double to women above the age of 65.
 ₹10 lakh annual grant to Panchayats and ₹10,000 salary for panchayat pradhans.
 Free pilgrimage scheme
 ₹1 crore compensation for soldiers killed in the line of duty.

Bharatiya Janata Party 
The BJP has launched ‘Mission Repeat’ with an aim to retain power in the State. BJP leader and PM Narendra Modi held two rallies in Una and Chamba and also inaugurated various projects in state.

BJP has also launched website to seek suggestions for its manifesto.

On 30 October, 30 campaigners of the party held simultaneous rallies in all 68 constituencies.

Manifesto 

 Youth: BJP promised the "Him Startup" scheme, with a corpus of ₹900 crore for the youth of the state.
 Employment: Amid criticism by the opposition for unemployment, it announced the created of 8 lakh job opportunities.
 Health: Creation of 5 new medical colleges. Amount of mobile clinics in every assembly constituency will be doubled.
 Road infrastructure: All-weather roads will connect all villages with an investment of ₹5,000 crore.
 Education: Bicycles will be given to girls from class 6 to 12 to go to schools. Setting up of two girls hostels in every district.
 Pilgrimage: Under the "Shakti" scheme, ₹12,000 crore will be spent over 10 years to develop infrastructure and transportation around areas of religious significance.
 Agriculture: An additional grant of ₹3,000 annually under the PM - Kisan Nidhi Yojna, 10 lakh farmers will be added to the program.
 Investigation of Waqf properties as per law under a judicial commission.
 Salaries: Discrepancies in disbursal of salaries to government workers will be removed.
 Increased compensation to soldiers' kin killed in the line of duty.
 GST will be limited to 12% for apple growers.
 Implementation of the Uniform Civil Code.

Indian National Congress  
From August 17 to 22, the Indian National Congress organized demonstrations throughout Himachal Pradesh as a part of its "Mehangai Chaupal". The block units of the Himachal PCC protested in all the 68 constituencies against price rise and inflation. The protests were a part of the wider "Halla Bol" demonstrations organized by the Congress against the BJP-led government in Delhi.

On 31 August 2022, the Indian National Congress launched its manifesto with its 10 guarantees in Himachal Ka Sankalp.

On 14 October 2022, Congress started its campaign with its "Parivartan Pratigya Rally" in Solan with senior Congress leaders, Priyanka Gandhi, Pratibha Singh, Mukesh Agnihotri, and Bhupesh Baghel.

On 4 November 2022, Priyanka Gandhi addressed a rally in Nagrota Bagwan, Kangra. She promised 1 lakh government jobs and restoration of the Old Pension Scheme in the first cabinet meeting if the Congress comes to power.

Manifesto
 Employment: Congress promised 5 lakh jobs to Himachal Pradesh youth out of which 1 lakh government jobs would be given in the first meeting of the cabinet after the formation of the government amid the country-wide unemployment crisis.
 Youth: Implementation of a Rs 680 crore startup fund, for which ₹10 crore would be provided to all assembly segments in the State. Interest free loans to youth would also be given.

 Healthcare: Congress promised to create free mobile clinics and upgrade health facilities as a part of its 10 guarantees in Himachal Ka Sankalp. Mobile clinics will be opened in all villages.

 Education: Quality education with English medium schools in assembly segments.

 Agriculture: Congress promised to buy 10 litres of milk from locals who own cows and buffaloes besides purchasing cow dung for Rs 2 per kg. Apple orchardists, who have been growing increasingly restless due to diminishing returns, have been told that they would be given the freedom to fix the right price for their fruits. It has also promised fair prices for crops and fruits

 Electricity: Free electricity up to 300 units monthly for all households.

 Women: Monthly ₹1500 financial assistance to women aged 18-60 years 
 Senior Citizens: Congress promised reimplementation of the Old Pension Scheme, which it did in Rajasthan and Chhattisgarh. Citizens above 75 years of age will be given special social security pension.
 Tourism: A new policy will be started to promote tourism in villages, "Smart Village" project will be started.

Surveys and polls

Opinion polls

Exit polls 
The Election Commission of India prohibited the conduct of any exit poll and publishing the result of exit polls from 12 November 2022 and 6:30 PM on 5 December 2022. Accordingly, these exit polls were released on the evening of 5 December.

Voter turnout 
The voter turnout of 75.60% was recorded in Himachal Pradesh as per provisional data.

Results 
The Indian National Congress emerged victorious with 40 seats, whereas the Bharatiya Janata Party fell down to 25 seats. Notably, the BJP lost all of its seats in union minister Anurag Thakur's home district Hamirpur to the Congress and 1 independent. 8 cabinet ministers in the BJP government lost their seats. 3 BJP rebels won as independents. On the other hand, lone CPI(M) MLA Rakesh Singha lost his seat to Congress candidate Kuldeep Singh Rathore.

Results by alliance and party

Results by division

Results by district

Results by constituency

See also
 2022 elections in India
 2022 Gujarat Legislative Assembly election

References 

State Assembly elections in Himachal Pradesh
Himachal Pradesh